Lester Fonville (born February 15, 1963) is an American former professional basketball player. He played at John F. Kennedy High School in his hometown of Mound Bayou, Mississippi, before he spent one year playing collegiately at Lake City Community College. After sitting out one season, he played college basketball with the Jackson State Tigers for three years and emerged as a potential NBA draft candidate. In his senior season, his 3.9 blocks per game were ranked third best in NCAA Division I. Fonville was selected to the second-team All-Southwestern Athletic Conference (SWAC) in 1986 and the first-team in 1987.

Fonville was drafted by the Portland Trail Blazers as the 29th overall pick of the 1987 NBA draft. Although he never played for the Trail Blazers, he signed with the team in April 1988, was on their 1988 playoff roster, and worked out regularly with their Lithuanian prospect, Arvydas Sabonis, prior to the 1988–89 NBA season.

Fonville played two seasons in the Continental Basketball Association (CBA) from 1987 to 1989. He played for the Mississippi Jets for the 1987–88 season, then stayed with the team the next season as they relocated and became the Wichita Falls Texans. He averaged 3.7 points and 5.3 rebounds over 34 games. He spent the 1990 season with the Norwood Flames of the South East Australian Basketball League (SEABL).

Career statistics

College

|-
| style="text-align:left;"| 1984–85
| style="text-align:left;"| Jackson State
| 25 || – || 17.4 || .467 || – || .489 || 5.7 || .5 || .2 || 2.2 || 7.1
|-
| style="text-align:left;"| 1985–86
| style="text-align:left;"| Jackson State
| 29 || – || 24.0 || .447 || – || .529 || 7.8 || 1.4 || .5 || 3.2 || 7.3
|-
| style="text-align:left;"| 1986–87
| style="text-align:left;"| Jackson State
| 29 || 26 || 30.3 || .454 || – || .660 || 10.3 || 1.0 || .7 || 3.9 || 13.7
|- class="sortbottom"
| style="text-align:center;" colspan="2"| Career
| 83 || 26 || 24.2 || .455 || – || .599 || 8.0 || 1.0 || .5 || 3.1 || 9.5

References

External links
College statistics

1963 births
Living people
African-American basketball players
American expatriate basketball people in Australia
American men's basketball players
Basketball players from Mississippi
Centers (basketball)
Florida Gateway College alumni
Jackson State Tigers basketball players
Junior college men's basketball players in the United States
Mississippi Jets players
People from Mound Bayou, Mississippi
Portland Trail Blazers draft picks
Wichita Falls Texans players
21st-century African-American people
20th-century African-American sportspeople